is a railway station in Kōtō, Tokyo, Japan, operated by Tobu Railway.

Lines

Station layout

The station consists of two opposed side platforms serving two tracks.

Platforms

Adjacent stations

History
The station opened on 15 April 1928.

Surrounding area
 Kameido Chuo Park

References

External links

 Tobu station information 

Railway stations in Japan opened in 1928
Railway stations in Tokyo